Kotka is a city in the southern part of the Kymenlaakso province on the Gulf of Finland. Kotka is a major port and industrial city and also a diverse school and cultural city, which was formerly part of the old Kymi parish; later, Kymi with the Haapasaari island and Karhula, the latter of which once separate from Kymi as the market town, were incorporated into Kotka. The neighboring municipalities of Kotka are Hamina, Kouvola and Pyhtää. Kotka belongs to the Kotka-Hamina subdivision, and with Kouvola, Kotka is one of the capital center of the Kymenlaakso region. It is the 19th largest city in terms of population as a single city, but the 12th largest city of Finland in terms of population as an urban area.

Kotka is located on the coast of the Gulf of Finland at the mouth of Kymi River and it is part of the Kymenlaakso region in southern Finland. The city center is located on an island surrounded by the sea called Kotkansaari ("Island of Kotka"). The most important highway in Kotka is Finnish national road 7 (E18), which goes west through Porvoo to Helsinki, the capital of Finland, and extends east to St. Petersburg, Russia.
The Port of Kotka is a major Finnish sea port that serves both the foreign trade of Finland and Russia.
The municipality is officially unilingually Finnish, with 89.8% being native Finnish speakers, 1% Swedish, and 9.3% speaking some other language.

Heraldry

The description of the older coat of arms read that "the upper field of the split shield is blue, the lower field silver, and in the center of the shield a natural stone with a golden eagle, and in the lower field the anchor and caduceus diagonally crossed, both blue," while the current coat of arms is described as follows: "In a blue field, the wings of a golden natural eagle are raised, standing with a crossed anchor and caduceus, both of which are silver." The first coat of arms of the city of Kotka was confirmed in 1881. However, the Kotka City Council had to renew the old coat of arms in 1954 because it did not meet heraldic requirements. The new coat of arms was designed by Olof Eriksson in 1957, Eriksson kept the new coat of arms as the main emblem of Kotka referring to the name of the city. From the images of the current coat of arms, the anchor reflects the importance of Kotka as a port town and caduceus in trade, industry and maritime traffic.

History

On April 16, 1878, the Senate of the Grand Duchy of Finland issued a declaration establishing a city on the southern part islands from the old Kymi parish, so in 1879 the islands of Kotkansaari and Hovinsaari were separated from Kymi and the city of Kotka was established.

The Second All-Russian Conference of the Russian Social Democratic Labour Party was held in Kotka, on 21–23 July (3–5 August) 1907.

Historically, Swedish was the official language in the city until 1902. From 1902 until 1906, the city was officially bilingual. Kotka has a Swedish speaking minority (see: Swedish-speaking population of Finland), which in the 1890s accounted for 16% of the city population and 3% in the 1950s. Today around 1% of the city's population are Swedish speakers. There is one school in Kotka where Swedish is the language of instruction, Kotka Svenska Samskola, which was founded in 1885.

Kotka region was one of the first heavily industrialized regions of Finland. Paper and pulp mills of Kotkamills and Stora Enso still remain important employers. In the last decades several factories have undergone restructuring which has led to an increasing unemployment. Since the 1980s the population of Kotka has been slowly decreasing, mostly due to domestic migration to Helsinki region.

Economy
Kotka's three largest employers at the beginning of 2018 were the City of Kotka, the Social and Health Services in Kymenlaakso (Kymsote), and Steveco. The largest livelihoods in 2004 were social services (31.7%) and local industry (21.9%). In 2006, the city's total expenditure was just over EUR 370 million and municipal tax revenue amounted to EUR 141.3 million with an income tax rate of 18.75%. At the end of 2015, the unemployment rate in Kotka was 22.2%, which is one of the highest and largest cities in Finland. In 2005, the unemployment rate in Kotka was 14.4% and in 2006 12.9%. In 2010, the relative number of unemployed in the city started to rise and at the end of 2012 the rate was 17.1%.

Architecture and culture

Structures 
Maritime Centre Vellamo is home to the Maritime Museum of Finland, the Museum of Kymenlaakso, the Coast Guard Museum, Information Centre Vellamo and the Kotka Cultural Centre. In addition to this, the building holds classrooms, seminar rooms, a 200-seat auditorium, Restaurant Laakonki with 100 seats, and Museum Shop Plootu.

The Kymenlaakso Museum operates at the Kantasatama Harbour in Kotka, at Maritime Centre Vellamo. The museum building, which has aroused much attention, was designed by the architect Ilmari Lahdelma.
The area of operation of the Kymenlaakso museum, which is maintained by the City of Kotka, covers seven municipalities. The museum information services and the work of the regional archaeologist cover the entire region of Kymenlaakso.
In building research, the museum serves as a public authority, with duties such as the issuing of opinions in building protection matters.
The collections of Kymenlaakso museum have been compiled since the 1920s. Alongside collections of museum items, the museum has an extensive archive of photographs. The collections are located at Metsola in Kotka.

Langinkoski Imperial Fishing Lodge (Langinkosken keisarillinen kalastusmaja) is a museum and fishing lodge in the valley of River Kymijoki. Kymijoki is one of the biggest rivers in Finland with a drainage basin with 11% of the area of Finland. Emperor Alexander III of Russia first visited Langinkoski in 1880 as Crown Prince. During his second visit to Langinkoski, he stated that he wanted a small fishing lodge near rapids. Construction of the house began in the summer of 1888 and was inaugurated the following year. The museum is visited annually by about 14,000 visitors a year.

Maretarium Aquarium opened in 2002, is located on Kotka Island, on the shore of the Gulf of Sapokka. It focuses on the presentation of Finnish fish species and water bodies. There are about 60 native and established fish species from Finland. The Maretarium was created in collaboration between the City of Kotka, the University of Helsinki and the Finnish Game and Fisheries Research Institute. In addition to aquariums, there are also facilities for researchers and the nature school. There is also the Maritime Theater, Meri Café Kristina and a souvenir shop.

The Church of St Nicholas is located in Isopuisto Park in Kotka city centre. Based on designs by Jakov Perrin, the neoclassical church was constructed between 1799–1801, and it is the oldest building in Kotka today. Facade consists of pillars for three entries, the bell tower and a cross dome.

Parks 

The numerous well-maintained parks and green areas make the centre of Kotka can be visited with a walk of about five kilometers, which can reach these park sites: Sapokka Watergarden, Katariina Seaside Park, Sibelius Park, Isopuisto ("Big Park"), Sculpture Promenade, Palotornivuori Park, Redutti-Kotka herb garden, Fuksinpuisto Park and Toivo Pekkanen Park.

 Sapokka Watergarden, awarded with numerous international prizes, is a real green oasis in the middle of Kotka. In addition to the variety of plants, the main elements of this park are water, stone and special lighting.
 Katariina Seaside Park is an extensive outdoor recreation area of more than 20 hectares, which grew up on the site of the oil loading port.
 Sculpture Promenade is Finland's largest outdoor gallery. The new works have been acquired for the sculpture promenade almost every year.

Food
In the 1980s, Baltic herring, salmon soup, head cheese, turnip potatoes called "lanttujyrkkö", and groat pie ("ryynipiirakka") were named Kotka's traditional parish dishes. Deep-fried doughnuts called  are also considered traditional pastries in Kotka.

Sports

The local football team is KTP. Founded in 1927, KTP has long, and successful football history. KTP won the Finnish football championship in 1951 and 1952, and Finnish Cup 4 times, in years 1958, 1961, 1967, and 1980. Currently the club plays in the Finnish second league Ykkönen.

KTP-Basket plays in Korisliiga. There is also rugby club Griffins RFC.

Local government

Notable people

Twin towns — Sister cities
Kotka is twinned with:

See also
Karhula
Kaunissaari
Kouvola–Kotka railway
Kyminlinna
Ruonala

References

External links

City of Kotka – Official website
Kotka Tourism – Official website of Kotka City Tourist Information

 
Cities and towns in Finland
Populated coastal places in Finland
Grand Duchy of Finland
Port cities and towns in Finland
Port cities and towns of the Baltic Sea
Populated places established in 1879
1879 establishments in Finland